Koen Oostenbrink (born 26 January 2000) is a Dutch professional footballer who plays as a midfielder for Eerste Divisie side Eindhoven.

Club career
Born in Veldhoven, Oostenbrink began his career at the PSV youth academy in 2009. He eventually rose through the club's ranks and made his professional debut for their reserve side, Jong PSV, in the Eerste Divisie on 18 October 2019 against NEC Nijmegen. He came on as an 83rd-minute substitute for Sekou Sidibe as Jong PSV were defeated 0–1.

On 4 August 2021, he joined Eindhoven as an amateur.

International career
Oostenbrink made his international debut for the Netherlands at the under-17 level on 30 September 2016 against Liechtenstein U17. He started as the Netherlands won 9–0.

Career statistics

Club

References

External links
Profile at the PSV website

2001 births
Living people
People from Veldhoven
Dutch footballers
Netherlands youth international footballers
Association football midfielders
Jong PSV players
FC Eindhoven players
Eerste Divisie players
Footballers from North Brabant